Marijan is a male Croatian first name. The Macedonian version of this name is Marjan. 

Marijan is also a last name found in Croatia.

People named Marijan

Marijan Beneš – Croatian boxer
Marijan Brkić Brk – Croatian musician
Marijan Brnčić – Croatian footballer
Marijan Buljat – Croatian footballer
Marijan Čerček – Croatian footballer
Marijan Hinteregger – Croatian-Austrian actor
Marijan Kanjer – Croatian Olympic swimmer
Marijan Kovačević – German-Croat footballer
Marijan Mrmić – Croatian footballer
Marijan Nikolić – Croatian footballer
Marijan Oblak – Croatian Catholic archbishop
Marijan Pušnik – Slovene football manager
Marijan Šunjić – Bosnian Croat Catholic bishop

See also 
 Marjan (name), cognate name also used in Slovenian, Macedonian and Serbian

References 

Croatian masculine given names
Given names